Moti Lal Malaviya was an Indian politician. He was elected to the lower House of Parliament, the Lok Sabha, from Khajuraho, Madhya Pradesh, India.

References

External links
 Official biographical sketch in Parliament of India website

1925 births
India MPs 1952–1957
India MPs 1957–1962
Indian National Congress politicians from Madhya Pradesh
Lok Sabha members from Madhya Pradesh